Indothele is a genus of Asian spiders in the family Ischnothelidae. It was first described by F. A. Coyle in 1995.

Species
 it contained the following species:
Indothele dumicola (Pocock, 1900) (type) – India
Indothele lanka Coyle, 1995 – Sri Lanka
Indothele mala Coyle, 1995 – India
Indothele rothi Coyle, 1995 – India

References

Mygalomorphae
Mygalomorphae genera